The Ayers House, in Lewistown, Montana, is a historic house built in 1913.  Also known as the Ricker Residence, it was listed on the National Register of Historic Places in 1986.

Wasmansdorff & Eastman designed it;  Folis & Coulter built it.

It is a one-and-a-half-story brick building.

References

Houses on the National Register of Historic Places in Montana
Houses completed in 1913
National Register of Historic Places in Fergus County, Montana
1913 establishments in Montana